The Central District of Hashtrud County is in East Azerbaijan province, Iran. At the National Census in 2006, its population was 45,982 in 10,428 households. The following census in 2011 counted 44,776 people in 12,207 households. At the latest census in 2016, the district had 43,463 inhabitants in 13,143 households.

References 

Hashtrud County

Districts of East Azerbaijan Province

Populated places in East Azerbaijan Province

Populated places in Hashtrud County